Thru the Moebius Strip is a 2005 Chinese computer-animated science fiction adventure film made in Mainland China.

Plot
The story is about the coming of age of a 14-year-old boy who grew up refusing to accept the loss of his father. He reaches the planet Raphicca 27.2 million light years away to find that his father is a prisoner in a kingdom of giant aliens who believe in magic and a medieval code of chivalry. In the midst of a raging battle between good and evil, Jac rescues his father, his new-found family of aliens, the planet of Raphicca, and ultimately, the universe.

Background
The film was produced in Shenzhen, China by the Institute of Digital Media Technology (IDMT). The project began with 200 animators in 2000 and grew to employ more than 400 by the end of production. Unlike traditional Chinese films, the movie was dubbed into English first. Previewed at the Second International Animation and Cartoon Festival at Hangzhou, China on April 27 and May 3, 2006, The film was based on an original story and designs by Jean "Moebius" Giraud.

Characters

Reception

Box office
The film earned  at the Chinese box office.

Critical reception
The film premiered at the Cannes Film Festival in 2005 and received good reviews for the animation work. However film critics have emphasized that the story was mostly catered to the west with eastern elements added in, making it difficult to satisfy any group of audience in any one particular region.

See also
History of Chinese animation
List of computer-animated films
List of animated feature films

References

External links
 Official Thru the Moebius Website - archive.org
 
 IDMT Website
 GDC entertainment

2005 animated films
2005 science fiction films
2000s action drama films
2005 fantasy films
2005 computer-animated films
2005 films
2005 drama films
American animated fantasy films
American animated science fiction films
English-language Chinese films
Chinese animated science fiction films
Space adventure films
Films produced by David Kirschner
2000s American films